Aegaeobuthus cyprius, also known as the Cyprus scorpion, is a species of scorpion in the family Buthidae. The species was discovered in 2000 using molecular phylogenetics.

References

Buthidae
Animals described in 2000
Scorpions of Europe